Blaze Europe was a developer and distributor of accessories and software for video game consoles, handheld media devices and personal computers.

The company is well known for releasing handheld versions of home consoles such as handheld versions of the Sega Mega Drive and the Neo Geo X.

The company is currently in liquidation.

References

External links

Computer companies of the United Kingdom